The hard clam (Mercenaria mercenaria), also known as the round clam, hard-shell (or hard-shelled) clam, or the quahog, is an edible marine bivalve mollusk that is native to the eastern shores of North America and Central America from Prince Edward Island to the Yucatán Peninsula. It is one of many unrelated edible bivalves that in the United States are frequently referred to simply as clams. Older literature sources may use the systematic name Venus mercenaria; this species is in the family Veneridae, the venus clams.

Confusingly, the "ocean quahog" is a different species, Arctica islandica, which, although superficially similar in shape, is in a different family of bivalves: it is rounder than the hard clam, usually has black periostracum, and there is no pallial sinus in the interior of the shell.

Alternative names

The hard clam has many alternative common names. It is also known as the Northern quahog, round clam, or chowder clam.

In fish markets, there are specialist names for different sizes of this species of clam. The smallest legally harvestable clams are called countnecks or peanuts, next size up are littlenecks, then topnecks. Above that are the cherrystones, and the largest are called quahogs or chowder clams.

The word comes from the Narragansett word "poquauhock", which is similar in Wampanoag and some other Algonquian languages; it is first attested in North American English in 1794. Native polities on the eastern Atlantic seaboard made valuable beads called wampum from the shells, especially those colored purple; the species name mercenaria is related to the Latin word for commerce. Today people living in coastal New England still use Algonquian words for the clam, as they have done for thousands of years.

In many areas where aquaculture is important, clam farmers have bred specialized versions of these clams with distinctions needed for them to be distinguished in the marketplace. These are quite similar to common "wild type" Mercenaria clams, except that their shells bear distinctive markings. These are known as the notata strain of quahogs, which occur naturally in low numbers wherever quahogs are found.

Distribution

Hard clams are quite common throughout New England, north into Canada, and all down the Eastern seaboard of the United States to Florida; but they are particularly abundant between Cape Cod and New Jersey, where seeding and harvesting them is an important commercial form of aquaculture. For example, the species is an important member of the suspension-feeding, benthic fauna of the lower Chesapeake Bay.

Rhode Island is situated right in the middle of "quahog country" and has supplied a quarter of the U.S.'s total annual commercial quahog catch. The quahog is the official shellfish of the U.S. state of Rhode Island. The species has also been introduced and is farmed on the Pacific coast of North America and in Great Britain and continental Europe. It reproduces sexually by females and males shedding gametes into the water.

Parasite

Quahog parasite unknown (QPX) is a parasite that affects the hard shell clam Mercenaria mercenaria. While little is known about the disease, research is currently under way in several laboratories. This research is fueled by the need to inform aquaculturists, who suffer financially because of the mortality rates in clams that QPX inflicts and the ensuing years in which runs must be left fallow to clear the disease. It was discovered along the coast of Cape Cod, Massachusetts in 1995.

Quahog parasite X (or quahog parasite unknown [QPX]) disease of the hard clam Mercenaria mercenaria is caused by a poorly known protistan parasite. Its DNA sequence analysis places the QPX parasite among the thraustochytrid stramenopiles. Thraustochytrids are common protists in marine sediments and the water column, but only a few thraustochytrids are known as parasites of marine animals. Although QPX disease was first recorded on the Atlantic coast of Canada in the early 1960s, it did not become a major economic problem until its appearance in cultured clams at Prince Edward Island, Massachusetts in 1992, and Virginia in 1997. Infected clams are characterized by the presence of blisters or pustules in the mantle and later by gaping and death.

Human use

In coastal areas of the New England states, Long Island, and New Jersey, restaurants known as raw bars or clam bars specialize in serving littlenecks and topnecks raw on an opened half-shell, usually with a cocktail sauce with horseradish, and often with lemon. Sometimes littlenecks are steamed and dipped in butter, though not as commonly as their soft-shelled clam cousin the "steamer". Littlenecks are often found in-the-shell in sauces, soups, stews, and clams casino, or substituted for European varieties such as the cockle in southern European seafood dishes. The largest clams are quahogs or chowders and cherrystones; they have the toughest meat and are used in such dishes as clam chowder, clam cakes, and stuffed clams, or are minced and mixed into dishes that use the smaller, more tender clams.

Historically, Native Americans used the quahog as a component in wampum, the shell beads exchanged in the North American fur trade. The Narragansetts used the hard clam for food and ornaments.

A population of hard clams exists in Southampton Water in Hampshire, England. Originally bred in the warm water outflows at Southampton Power Station for use as eel bait, the population became self-sustaining and can now be found in Southampton Water and has also spread to Portsmouth Harbour and Langstone Harbour.

Clams and red tide

The term "red tide" refers to an accumulation of a toxin, such as saxitoxin, produced by marine algae. Filter-feeding shellfish are affected, such as clams, oysters, and mussels. The toxin affects the human central nervous system. Eating contaminated shellfish, raw or cooked, can be fatal. Some other kinds of algal blooms make the seawater appear red, but red tide blooms do not always discolor the water, nor are they related to tides.

Notes

References

Clams
Veneridae
Marine molluscs of North America
Molluscs of the Atlantic Ocean
Molluscs of the United States
Molluscs of Mexico
Fauna of the Northeastern United States
Fauna of the Southeastern United States
Molluscs described in 1758
Taxa named by Carl Linnaeus
Symbols of Rhode Island
Rhode Island cuisine
Native American culture
Seafood in Native American cuisine